Jim Higgins (born 4 May 1945) is an Irish former Fine Gael politician. He served as a member of Seanad Éireann, Dáil Éireann, and was an EPP Member of the European Parliament for the North-West constituency from 2004 to 2014.

Early life
He was born in Ballyhaunis, County Mayo in 1945. He was educated at St. Jarlath's College, Tuam and at University College Galway. He was twice named Best Individual Speaker at the Junior Chamber Ireland debating championships (1978, 1979) and was the captain of the International Tripartite Debating Team. Higgins worked as a secondary school teacher before becoming involved in local politics.

Political career

He served as a member of Mayo County Council from 1979 to 1995, acting as vice-chairman of the council from 1980 to 1981. He first ran for Dáil Éireann at the 1981 general election, but was unsuccessful. However, he was nominated by the Taoiseach Garret FitzGerald to the 15th Seanad Éireann.

He lost his Seanad seat in 1982 but was elected to the 17th Seanad by the Labour Panel in 1983, remaining in the upper house until 1987 as a member of the 17th Seanad. He was successful at the 1987 general election, winning a seat in the 25th Dáil as a Fine Gael Teachta Dála (TD) for Mayo East. He was re-elected to the Dáil in 1989, 1992 and 1997.

In 1994 the Rainbow Coalition of Fine Gael, Labour Party and Democratic Left came to power and Higgins was appointed as Minister of State at the Department of Finance.  The following year he became Minister of State at the Departments of the Taoiseach and Defence, as well as Chief Whip of the government.  He remained in that position until a Fianna Fáil–Progressive Democrats coalition took office after the 1997 general election.

Like many of his Fine Gael colleagues at the 2002 general election, Higgins lost his seat in the Mayo constituency. However, he was elected to Seanad Éireann by the Labour Panel, becoming a member of the 22nd Seanad.

For over two years he brought to the Dáil the case of the extended McBrearty family who were wrongly accused of murder. He raised allegations of Garda corruption in County Donegal. He was also responsible for bringing before the Dáil a £30 million overspend by the state transport company Iarnród Éireann on a safety signalling system which led to the establishment of an all-party parliamentary inquiry.

European Parliament
In the 2004 European Parliament election Higgins was elected to the European Parliament as a Fine Gael / European People's Party MEP for the North-West constituency. He was re-elected at the 2009 European Parliament election.

At the European Parliament, he served as a member of the Committee on Transport and Tourism. He was a substitute member of the Petitions Committee. He was also a substituent member of the Fisheries Committee. Higgins's other duties included membership of the EU-Chile Joint Parliamentary Committee, the Euro-Latin American Parliamentary Assembly and he was a substitute member of the Delegation for Relations with Japan.

He was one of five MEPs to hold the position of Quaestor. He was elected by other parliamentarians in the European Parliament to this position. He lost his seat at the 2014 European Parliament election.

References

External links

 

1945 births
Living people
Alumni of the University of Galway
Fine Gael MEPs
Fine Gael senators
Fine Gael TDs
Government Chief Whip (Ireland)
Irish schoolteachers
Local councillors in County Mayo
Members of the 15th Seanad
Members of the 17th Seanad
Members of the 22nd Seanad
Members of the 25th Dáil
Members of the 26th Dáil
Members of the 27th Dáil
Members of the 28th Dáil
MEPs for the Republic of Ireland 2004–2009
MEPs for the Republic of Ireland 2009–2014
Ministers of State of the 27th Dáil
Nominated members of Seanad Éireann
People educated at St Jarlath's College
Articles containing video clips